Philip "Philly" Ryan (born 1968) is an Irish retired Gaelic footballer who played as a goalkeeper for the Tipperary senior team.

Born in Clonmel, County Tipperary, Ryan first arrived on the inter-county scene at the age of sixteen when he first linked up with the Tipperary minor team before later joining the under-21 and junior sides. He joined the senior panel during the 1987 championship. Ryan subsequently became a regular member of the starting fifteen.

As a member of the Munster inter-provincial team on a number of occasions Ryan never won a Railway Cup medal. At club level he is a five-time championship medallist with Clonmel Commercials.

Ryan retired from inter-county football following the conclusion of the 2003 championship.

In retirement from playing Ryan became involved in team management and coaching. He served as manager of the Tipperary minor team on one occasion.

Honours

Player

Clonmel Commercials
Tipperary Senior Football Championship (5): 1986, 1989, 1990, 1994, 2002

Tipperary
All-Ireland Senior B Football Championship (1): 1995

References

1968 births
Living people
Clonmel Commercials Gaelic footballers
Gaelic football coaches
Gaelic football goalkeepers
Gaelic football managers
Gaelic football selectors
Munster inter-provincial Gaelic footballers
Tipperary inter-county Gaelic footballers